MAX IV is a next-generation synchrotron radiation facility in Lund, Sweden. Its design and planning has been carried out within the Swedish national laboratory, MAX-lab, which up until 2015 operated three accelerators for synchrotron radiation research: MAX I (550 MeV, opened 1986), MAX II (1,5 GeV, opened 1997) and MAX III (700 MeV, opened 2008). MAX-lab supported about 1000 users from over 30 countries annually. The facility operated 14 beamlines with a total of 19 independent experimental stations, supporting a wide range of experimental techniques such as macromolecular crystallography, electron spectroscopy, nanolithography and production of tagged photons for photo-nuclear experiments. The facility closed on 13 December (St Lucia dagen) 2015 in preparation for MAX IV.

On 27 April 2009 the Swedish Ministry of Education and Research, Swedish Research Council, Lund University, Region Skåne and Vinnova, a Swedish government funding agency, decided to fund the research center.

The new laboratories, including two storage rings and a full-energy linac is situated in Brunnshög in Lund North East. The inauguration of MAX IV took place 21 June 2016, on the day of summer solstice. The larger of the two storage rings has a circumference of 528 meters, operates at 3 GeV energy, and has been optimized for high-brightness x-rays. The smaller storage ring (circumference 96 meters) is operated at 1.5 GeV energy and has been optimized for UV. There are also plans for a future expansion of the facility that would add a free-electron laser (FEL) to the facility, but is yet to be funded.

There are currently 16 beamlines at the facility with 10 of them located around the 3 GeV ring, 5 around the 1.5 GeV ring and one at the of the linear accelerator.

See also
 List of synchrotron radiation facilities
 European Spallation Source

References

External links 
 Website of the MAX IV Laboratory
 Lightsources.org, information about the world's synchrotron and free electron laser light source facilities
 International evaluation of the MAX IV concept (2006), in .pdf format
 Status of the MAX IV Laboratory, article published by Taylor & Francis in Synchrotron Radiation News on 1 February 2016, available online: http://www.tandfonline.com/doi/full/10.1080/08940886.2016.1124683
 MAX IV is Ready to Make the Invisible Visible, article published by Taylor & Francis in Synchrotron Radiation News on 2 December 2016, available online: http://www.tandfonline.com/doi/full/10.1080/08940886.2016.1244463

Synchrotron radiation facilities
Lund University
Proposed buildings and structures in Sweden